Pachynocera is a genus of parasitic flies in the family Tachinidae.

Species
Pachynocera petiolata Townsend, 1919

Distribution
Peru.

References

Diptera of South America
Dexiinae
Tachinidae genera
Monotypic Brachycera genera
Taxa named by Charles Henry Tyler Townsend